Dudley Do-Right is a fictional character created by Alex Anderson, Chris Hayward, Allan Burns,  Jay Ward, and Bill Scott, who appears as the main protagonist of "Dudley Do-Right of the Mounties", a segment on The Rocky and Bullwinkle Show. 

The segment parodies early 20th-century melodrama and silent film (the "Northern"), using only a piano as a musical background.

Dudley Do-Right's first appearance specifically incorporates silent film tropes such as intertitles and iris shots, as well as incorporating a similar plot to 1921 silent film O'Malley of the Mounted, starring William S. Hart.

Overview

Dudley Do-Right is a dim-witted, but conscientious and cheerful Canadian Mountie who works for Inspector Fenwick. Do-Right is always trying to catch his nemesis, Snidely Whiplash, and rescue Inspector Fenwick's daughter, damsel-in-distress Nell Fenwick, with whom Do-Right is deeply infatuated. He usually succeeds only by pure luck or through the actions of his horse, named "Horse."

A running gag throughout the series is Nell Fenwick's disinterest in Do-Right; instead, she appears to be infatuated with his horse. She is shown to kiss the horse rather than Do-Right, and when Do-Right leaves the Mounties she is only upset about the horse leaving. In Do-Right's first appearance, the narrator states,Dudley loved Nell. Unfortunately, she loved his horse.In the standard intro, Do-Right jumps on Horse and furiously rides him backwards as titles appear. While riding, he comes across Whiplash tying Nell Fenwick to a railroad track. He tips his hat to the two, before realizing what is going on and rights himself in time to save the day.

Dudley Do-Right made a cameo in a "Rocky and Bullwinkle Fan Club" segment as the hero in "She Can't Pay the Rent", a play staged by Boris Badenov. Rocky and Bullwinkle also appeared as cameos in "Mountie Bear".

The Dudley Do-Right Show
The Dudley Do-Right Show is an animated television series assembled by P.A.T. Film Services, consisting of cartoons produced by Jay Ward Productions and Total Television that aired Sunday mornings on American Broadcasting Company (ABC) from April 27, 1969, to September 6, 1970. Each half-hour show included two segments each of "Dudley Do-Right of the Mounties" and "The World of Commander McBragg", along with one segment each of "Tooter Turtle" and "The Hunter". Dudley Do-Right was a Jay Ward production, while the other segments were products of Total Television. Both companies used Gamma Productions, a Mexico-based animation studio.

The U.S. syndicated version of The Dudley Do-Right Show, called Dudley Do Right and Friends, follows the same format but features different episodes. The syndicated package features "Dudley Do-Right of the Mounties", "The World of Commander McBragg", "The King and Odie", and "The Hunter". The latter two originally appeared as part of King Leonardo and His Short Subjects, a series that aired between October 15, 1960, and September 28, 1963, on NBC-TV. Twenty-six new segments of both series were produced for CBS-TV's Tennessee Tuxedo and His Tales in 1963, and these later segments are included in the syndicated Dudley Do Right and Friends.

Actors (voice overs) included:
Bill Scott — Dudley Do-Right
June Foray — Nell Fenwick
Hans Conried — Snidely Whiplash
Paul Frees — Inspector Fenwick/Narrator
William Conrad did several (but not all) of the narrations.
Evan Cox - cameo in The Actors Challenge

Segments

Season 1
The Disloyal Canadians
Stokey the Bear
Mortgagin' the Mountie Post
Trap Bait
The Masked Ginny Lynn

Season 2
The Centaur
Railroad Tracks
 Fireclosing Mortgages
Snidely Mounted Police
Mother Love
Mountie Bear
Inspector Dudley Do-Right
Recruiting Campaign
Out of Uniform
Lure of the Footlights
Bullet-Proof Suit
 Miracle Drug
 Elevenworth Prison
Saw Mill
Finding Gold
Mountie Without a Horse
Mother Whiplash's Log Jam
Stolen Art Masterpiece

Season 3
Mechanical Dudley
Flicker Rock
Faithful Dog
Coming-Out Party
Robbing Banks
Skagway Dogsled-Pulling Contest
Canadian Railway's Bridge
Niagara Falls
Snidely's Vic Whiplash Gym
Marigolds
Trading Places

Season 4
Top Secret
The Locket
The Inspector's Nephew
Matinee Idol
Snidely Arrested

One segment originally seen on The Bullwinkle Show, "Stokey the Bear", was withheld from all reissues of the series for several decades because the U.S. Forest Service objected to the image of a bear that started forest fires, even though he had been hypnotized by Snidely to do so. The segment was released on home video by Sony Wonder and Classic Media in 2005.

Legacy

On May 28, 1999, Universal's Islands of Adventure opened Dudley Do-Right's Ripsaw Falls, a log flume ride based on the cartoon segments. Guests enter a queue themed to resemble a theater, with Dudley, Nell, Snidely, and Horse presented as actors. Riders board cartoon logs and journey "into" the story, where Snidely has cruelly captured Nell Fenwick. Horse and Dudley make their first appearance in front of a cyclorama backdrop, theatrically "charging" to the rescue. The ride system contains three drops, the last and steepest of which is seventy-five feet. It is a hybrid flume/coaster that utilizes steel track to not only shoot guest-filled logs down the final drop, but under the water's surface and over a bunny hill. The ride system was designed and built by Mack GmbH.

On August 27, 1999, Universal Studios released a comedy live-action film based on the character, titled Dudley Do-Right. It starred Brendan Fraser, Sarah Jessica Parker, and Alfred Molina. It received negative reviews and was a box-office failure, grossing less than $10 million domestically against a 22 million budget.

In 2000, music historian Irwin Chusid claimed that scat singer Shooby Taylor's voice reminded him of Dudley Do-Right's "virile baritone."

Premiering in 2013, the Canadian adult animated series Fugget About It features a dimwitted yet well-meaning Mountie character, Strait McCool. McCool exhibits similar appearance, voice acting, behavior, and personality to Do-Right (except for the addition of sexual and drug references). It may be inferred that the character of McCool is a parody of Do-Right.

See also 

 The Dover Boys, a 1942 Warner Brothers cartoon parodying silent film era storytelling

References

Further reading

 Chunovic, Louis. (1996) The Rocky and Bullwinkle Book. Bantam Books.

External links
Dudley Do-Right at Don Markstein's Toonopedia. Archived from the original on May 5, 2016.

Television characters introduced in 1961
1969 American television series debuts
1970 American television series endings
1960s American animated television series
1970s American animated television series
1960s American police comedy television series
1970s American police comedy television series
American Broadcasting Company original programming
American children's animated comedy television series
Comedy film characters
Fictional Canadian people
Fictional Royal Canadian Mounted Police officers
Jay Ward Productions
Male characters in animation
Rocky and Bullwinkle characters
Television shows adapted into films
General Mills